The Congressional Baseball Game for Charity is an annual baseball game played each summer by members of the United States Congress. The game began as a casual event among colleagues in 1909 and eventually evolved into one of Washington, D.C.'s most anticipated annual pastimes, according to the House of Representatives Office of the Historian. In the game, Republicans and Democrats form separate teams and play against each other.

Today, the game raises money for four charities: the Boys and Girls Clubs of Greater Washington, the Washington Nationals Dream Foundation, the Washington Literacy Center, and—following a pre-game practice shooting in 2017—the US Capitol Police Memorial Fund. The game is usually attended by crowds of congressional staffers, congressional families and, occasionally, even dignitaries and US presidents.

History

The 1909 game was organized by Representative John Tener of Pennsylvania, a former professional baseball player. The Boston Daily Globe observed, "The game was brewing for weeks and the members of the house were keyed up a high pitch of enthusiasm. Deep, dark rumors were in circulation that 'ringers' would be introduced, but when they lined up at 4 o'clock the nine Republicans were stalwart, grand old party men, while the Democrats were of the pure Jeffersonian strain."

The Democrats beat their Republican opponents, 26–16 in the first game, and continued their winning streak for the first six games. Republicans won their first game in 1916. Due to its growing popularity, the Congressional Baseball Game was first covered via radio in 1928. The radio broadcast continued in succeeding years.

The event has, at times, interrupted the workflow of Congress. In 1914, Speaker James Beauchamp "Champ" Clark of Missouri became frustrated with the Congressional Baseball Game interfering with legislative business. Once, the House was to debate an appropriations bill on Civil War cotton damage, but a quorum was not present because of the game.

Despite its appeal, the annual game occurred intermittently because of interruptions due to the Great Depression, the Second World War, and intervention by the House leadership. The game was held biennially until the Washington Evening Star newspaper sponsored it annually from 1946 to 1958. Despite the sponsorship, Speaker Sam Rayburn of Texas ended the game in 1958, saying it had become too physically straining on the members and was causing injuries. With the new sponsor, the Roll Call Trophy was created, for the team that wins each best-of-five series.  It was first awarded in 1965—to the Republican team, the first team to win three games since Roll Call had begun its sponsorship. Since 1965, a new trophy is awarded to the next team to win three games (over the next three, four, or five years), following the year in which the most recent trophy was awarded. As of the 2017 game, 14 trophies have been awarded—ten to the Republicans' team and four to the Democrats' team.

On June 14, 2017, one day before the annual event, a gunman opened fire on Republican members of Congress who were practicing for the next day's game. Four people were shot including House Majority Whip Steve Scalise. The gunman was himself killed by Capitol Police. In a 2021 report on every domestic terrorist act in the U.S. from 2015 to 2019, the FBI classified the 2017 shooting as an act of domestic terrorism. Despite discussions about postponing the game, officials said it would be held as scheduled.  The shooting resulted in a dramatic increase in interest for the game; it was reported that revenue from ticket sales and online donations had exceeded $1 million, and organizers stated that 24,959 people were in attendance. C-SPAN announced that it would televise the game, and the 2021 game was televised by FS1 as well.

Locations

The game was initially played at the American League Park. However, after the park's destruction in a fire in March 1911, it was played at the Griffith Stadium built on the same site in Northwest Washington, D.C. In 1962, it was moved to the new District Stadium (later renamed Robert F. Kennedy Stadium). It remained there until 1972 when the Washington Senators moved to Texas, becoming the Texas Rangers as RFK did not need a long-term baseball seating layout or field. It moved for the next two decades to the Memorial Stadium in Baltimore, Maryland, then to Langley High School in McLean, Virginia for 1977; and Four Mile Run Park in Alexandria, Virginia. From 1995 to 2004, the game was played in Prince George's Stadium in Bowie, Maryland. From 2005 to 2007, the event returned to RFK Stadium when the Montreal Expos moved to Washington to become the Washington Nationals. In 2008, Nationals Park was completed, and the Nationals moved there along with the Congressional Baseball Game.

In the late 1960s, a post-game reception for members of Congress and their staff was organized and sponsored by Sears, Roebuck and Company. However, attendance was meager until 1972 when Sears' Washington office Public Information Officer Larry Horist took over the management of the event and established the Most Valuable Player awards to be voted by each team and presented by the Speaker of the House and the Majority Leader of the Senate. He also obtained photos of the players in their hometown uniforms, producing baseball cards packaged in gum wrappers. A limited number of autographed master sheets of the cards occasionally appear for sale on Internet auction sites. The cards included such personalities as Senator Eugene McCarthy (D-MN), Barry Goldwater, Jr. (R-AZ), and professional player "Vinegar Bend" Mizell (R-NC). The cards were publicized in The Washington Post and became part of the permanent collection of the Baseball Hall of Fame.

Rosters

Current and recent year's team rosters are available from the game's official website.

While the modern Congressional Baseball Game comprises both House and Senate Members, this was not always the case. From 1909 to 1949, House Members exclusively filled the rosters—although there appears to have been no prohibition against Senators. Bicameral baseball was inaugurated in 1950, when Senator Harry P. Cain of Washington joined the Republican team and Senator-elect George Smathers of Florida, a former Representative, joined the Democratic team.

In a few cases, former professional baseball players were elected to Congress and impacted the game. In the case of Wilmer "Vinegar Bend" Mizell of North Carolina, a former professional pitcher, the Republican team was victorious for each year that he played. Fielding a once-a-year team presented some problems for members, who often grew rusty when it came to batting. Strong pitching proved decisive in most games but, in 1963, neither team could field a pitcher. As a result, relief pitcher George Susce of the Washington Senators pitched for both teams.

In 1917, Representative Jeannette Rankin of Montana tossed out the first pitch and kept score, becoming the first woman to participate in the annual event. More than 70 years later, in 1993, Representatives Ileana Ros-Lehtinen of Florida, Maria Cantwell of Washington, and Blanche Lincoln of Arkansas became the first women to break into the starting lineup.

In 1971, the first African Americans joined the game. Delegate Walter E. Fauntroy of the District of Columbia and Rep. Ron Dellums of California joined the Democratic roster. Despite Fauntroy's hitting prowess, the Democrats lost their eighth straight annual game, 7–3.

In 1909, Rep. Joseph F. O'Connell of Massachusetts hit the first home run, gaining three runs for the Democrats. In the same year, Republican Rep. Edward B. Vreeland of New York was the first player to be withdrawn due to an injury. In 1957, Rep. Gerald Ford of Michigan hit the first known grand slam, while playing for the Republicans. In 1979, Republican Rep. Ron Paul of Texas hit what is believed to be the first home run hit over the fence. Reps. John Shimkus of Illinois and Greg Steube of Florida are the only other players to hit out-of-the-park home runs, doing so in 1997 and 2021, respectively. Paul was inducted into the Congressional Baseball Hall of Fame before the 2012 game.

Hall of Fame
The Roll Call Congressional Baseball Hall of Fame was founded in 1993 and a brief description of each of the inductees through 2011 is available via the sponsor's website.

In the early years of the game, each team wore a uniform that was either plain or had the words "Republicans" or "Democrats" embroidered on it. In modern games, members typically wear uniforms of the professional baseball teams or college baseball teams in their congressional district or home state. In the 1920s, pomp and fanfare preceded each game. The United States Navy Band and United States Marine Corps Band traditionally kicked off the festivities with patriotic tunes. In 1926, the Republicans paraded into American League Field on a live elephant, while in 1932, both teams had costumed mascots entertain the crowds. During the 1960s, the teams had cheerleaders dressed in uniforms.

Game results
As of the 2022 game, Republicans lead the series, 44–42–1. The official website of the Congressional Baseball Game for Charity seemingly does not count three of those Republican wins because its History page listed (in 2017, but before the 2017 game) the series record as 39–39–1 (in a blue, red, white, and black bar near the bottom of the page). However, the same page states—in reference to the Roll Call Trophy—that "[t]o date, 10 of these coveted trophies have been awarded, eight to the Republicans and two to the Democrats." That statement indicates that the paragraphs of the History page were probably written after the 2002 game and before the 2005 game because the tenth trophy was awarded in 2002 and the eleventh trophy was awarded in 2005.

The Republicans won their 35th game in 2002 and then won seven more games after that (in 2003 to 2008, plus 2016). As of 2002, the Democrats had won 32 games; from 2003 to 2016, the Democrats won seven more games, for 39 wins (as of the 2016 game). Although the series record outlined in the bar near the bottom of the page includes the Democrats' seven wins between 2003 and 2016, the bar includes only four of the Republicans' seven wins during that same period. Scores, locations, and other details of past games are available here to the extent they are known.

See also 
 Congressional Soccer Match

References

External links

 

Baseball competitions in the United States
Sports competitions in Washington, D.C.
Recurring sporting events established in 1909
Legislative branch of the United States government
1909 establishments in Washington, D.C.
Politics and sports